Two Mountains was a federal electoral district in Quebec, Canada, that was represented in the House of Commons of Canada from 1867 to 1917.

It was created by the British North America Act, 1867. The electoral district was abolished in 1914 when it was merged into Laval—Two Mountains riding.

Members of Parliament

This riding elected the following Members of Parliament:

Election results

By-election: On election being declared void, 14 January 1875

By-election: On Mr. Globensky's resignation

According to Canadian Directory of Parliament, 1867–1967, p. 234., this by-election did not occur and Mr. Globensky sat until the dissolution of the 3rd Parliament.

By-election: On Mr. Daoust's death, 28 December 1891

By-election: On election being declared void, 6 August 1902

See also 

 List of Canadian federal electoral districts
 Past Canadian electoral districts

External links 
 Riding history from the Library of Parliament

Former federal electoral districts of Quebec